John Morelli may refer to:

 Jack Morelli (born 1962), comic book letterer and author, also credited under the name John Morelli
 John Morelli (American football) (1923–2004), American football player